Cobalos is a genus of moths of the family Noctuidae.

Species
 Cobalos angelicus Smith, 1899
 Cobalos franciscanus Smith, 1899

References
 Cobalos at Markku Savela's Lepidoptera and Some Other Life Forms
 Natural History Museum Lepidoptera genus database

Hadeninae